Little Accident was a 1928 Broadway three-act comedy written by Floyd Dell and Thomas Mitchell (who also played Norman Overbeck in the play). It was based on Dell's 1927 novel An Unmarried Father. It was produced by Crosby Gaige and directed by Joseph Graham and Arthur Hurley running for 303 performances from October 9, 1928 to July 1929 at the Morosco Theatre and the Ambassador Theatre. It was included in Burns Mantle's The Best Plays of 1928-1929.

The play and the novel were made into the 1930 film The Little Accident starring Douglas Fairbanks Jr. and Anita Page and the 1939 film Little Accident starring Hugh Herbert and Florence Rice. Both films were released by Universal Pictures.

Plot

Cast

 Geraldine Wall as	Doris Overbeck	
 Malcolm Williams as J.J. Overbeck	
 Katherine Carrington as Lucinda Overbeck	
 Susanne Jackson as Mrs. Overbeck	
 Thomas Mitchell as Norman Overbeck
 Katharine Alexander as Isabel Drury	
 Patricia Barclay as Monica Case	
 Clare Woodbury as Mrs. Case
 Madelaine Barr as Katie	
 Florence Brinton as Janet Parke	
 Elizabeth Bruce as Miss Hemingway	
 John Butler as Hicks	
 Elvia Enders as Madge Ferris	
 Harry Forsman as Rev. Doctor Gifford	
 Olga Hanson as Miss Clark	
 Desmond Kelley as Doctor Zernecke		
 Helen Myrnes as Emily Crane	
 Adrian Rosely as Rudolpho Amendelaro	
 Fleming Ward as Gilbert Rand
 Emory Parnell as Policeman

References
 
 Floyd Dell
 Playbill - Ambassador Theatre

External links

1928 plays
Broadway plays
Plays set in Illinois
Chicago in fiction